Armando Quintero Martínez (born 25 November 1954 in Mexico City) is a Mexican left-wing politician and labor leader affiliated with Movimiento Ciudadano.

Political career
Quintero is a founder and labor leader of the UNAM's Workers Union (Sindicato de Trabajadores de la Universidad Nacional Autónoma de México or STUNAM); he is also one of the PRD founders.  Quintero served in the lower house of the Mexican Congress during the LVI Legislature. In 2000 he gained a seat in the Legislative Assembly of the Federal District and in 2003 he was elected borough mayor in Iztacalco, Mexican Federal District. He ran again for the Iztacalco mayorship in 2015 after switching parties from the Party of the Democratic Revolution to Movimiento Ciudadano.

References

1954 births
Politicians from Mexico City
Living people
Mexican trade unionists
Members of the Chamber of Deputies (Mexico)
Members of the Congress of Mexico City
Citizens' Movement (Mexico) politicians
20th-century Mexican politicians
21st-century Mexican politicians